Frank Boulton is a baseball league founder and the owner of several teams, including the Long Island Ducks. He started the Atlantic League of Professional Baseball in 1998 and is its Chief Executive Officer (CEO).

References

Living people
Baseball managers
Year of birth missing (living people)
American chief executives of professional sports organizations
Place of birth missing (living people)